Asia Muhammad and Maria Sanchez were the defending champions, but chose not to participate.

Vladica Babić and Caitlin Whoriskey won the title, defeating Gabriela Talabă and Marcela Zacarías in the final, 6–4, 6–2.

Seeds

Draw

Draw

References
Main Draw

Central Coast Pro Tennis Open - Doubles